Taekwondo at the 2021 Islamic Solidarity Games was held in Konya, Turkey from 9 to 12 August 2022.

Medal table

Medalists

Men

Women

Participating nations
236 taekwondo player from 39 countries:

References

External links
Official website

2021 Islamic Solidarity Games
Islamic Solidarity Games
2021
International taekwondo competitions hosted by Turkey